Jarqavieh Sofla Rural District is a rural district (dehestan) in Jarqavieh Sofla District, Isfahan County, Isfahan Province, Iran. At the 2006 census, its population was 460, in 151 families.  The rural district has 19 villages.

References 

Rural Districts of Isfahan Province
Isfahan County